Niceforonia mantipus, the mantipus robber frog, is a species of frog in the family Strabomantidae. It is endemic to Colombia and found on the Cordillera Occidental and Cordillera Central,  asl. Its natural habitats are cloud forests and secondary forests. It lives in leaf-litter and on ground. It is threatened by habitat loss.

References

mantipus
Amphibians of the Andes
Amphibians of Colombia
Endemic fauna of Colombia
Taxonomy articles created by Polbot
Amphibians described in 1908